The Rayward–Shepherd House, also known as Tirranna and as the John L. Rayward House, was designed by renowned architect Frank Lloyd Wright and built in New Canaan, Connecticut in 1955 for Joyce and John Rayward. Although commissioned by the Raywards, Herman R. Shepherd completed the design after purchasing it in 1964. William Allin Storrer credits Shepherd's actions with salvaging the house, repairing the poor work that Storrer attributes to John Rayward's "constant pursuit of the lowest bid." (Storrer, 411)

"Tirranna" is an Australian aboriginal word meaning "running waters," an apt name for this spectacular residence. Located on a pond just off the Noroton River, it features elaborate land and water-scaping. Built of standard concrete block, glass, and Colorundum flooring, and trimmed with Philippine mahogany, most of the house conforms to a hemicycle plan. Its living/dining wing overlooks a pool which steps down to a pond and extensive landscaped gardens, designed by Frank Okamura, landscape architect for the Brooklyn Botanic Garden.  Charles Middeleer, a notable local landscape architect, also contributed to the landscape design.

The Rayward House includes a later (1958) extension featuring an observatory above the master bedroom dressing room, as well as a playhouse for the Raywards’ daughters, Victoria and Jennifer (1957), which echoes the hemicycle form of the main house. 

The site was purchased by Herman R. Shepherd in 1964. According to Storrer, after 1964, Wright's successor firm, Taliesin Associated Architects (TAA), "provided a major extension beyond the work room...." which "leads to a greenhouse with servant and guest quarters, shop and extra carport." Later work by TAA "brought about the enclosure of the space between original bedroom wing and added master bedroom wing, gaining an atrium and informal living room.... Even later, a circular deck was added above the main pool." (Storrer, 411)

It had been purchased in the late 1990s by businessman Ted Stanley and his wife Vada. After Stanley's death, the property with 15-acres was put on the market in January 2017 for US$8,000,000 by his heirs. The house sold in March 2018 for a reported US$4.8 million.

References

 Storrer, William Allin. The Frank Lloyd Wright Companion. University Of Chicago Press, 2006,  (S.383)

External links
 Photos of the Rayward–Shepherd House
 Modern Homes Survey - New Canaan Connecticut - Tirranna/Rayward House

Frank Lloyd Wright buildings
Houses in New Canaan, Connecticut
Houses completed in 1955
Houses completed in 1958